Jörn-Uwe Fahrenkrog-Petersen (born 10 March 1960) is a German keyboard player, producer and composer. He was the keyboardist of the band Nena and co-wrote their world famous hit "99 Luftballons" as well as another great hit entitled "Irgendwie, irgendwo, irgendwann" (German for sometime, somewhere, somehow).

Career 

In 2011, Fahrenkrog-Petersen joined forces with former Modern Talking lead singer Thomas Anders as a dance-pop duo Anders/Fahrenkrog. The two released their first single "Gigolo" on 27 May 2011, followed by the album "Two" on 10 June. The album peaked at No. 11 in the German album charts.

References

External links 

 
 
 

1960 births
German new wave musicians
German record producers
German songwriters
Living people
Musicians from Berlin
Nena (band) members